The Chuhofa Sky Building is a 38-story,  residential skyscraper completed in 2016 and located in Taichung's 7th Redevelopment Zone, Xitun District, Taichung, Taiwan.  As of February 2021, it is 23rd tallest building in Taichung. The building was constructed under strict requirements of preventing damage caused by earthquakes and typhoons common in Taiwan.

See also
 List of tallest buildings in Taiwan
 List of tallest buildings in Taichung
 Taichung's 7th Redevelopment Zone

References

2016 establishments in Taiwan
Residential skyscrapers in Taiwan
Skyscrapers in Taichung
Apartment buildings in Taiwan
Residential buildings completed in 2016
Taichung's 7th Redevelopment Zone